George Floyd protests in New York may refer to:

 George Floyd protests in New York (state), protests in the entire state
 George Floyd protests in New York City, protests in New York City alone